Helen Marshall (October 25, 1898 – August 1988) was an American historian of nursing.

Life and work
Helen Edith Marshall was born in Braman, Oklahoma, on 25 October 1898. She was awarded her A.B. degree from the College of Emporia in 1923, her M.A. from the University of Chicago in 1929 and her Ph.D. from Duke University in 1934. In between her studies, she taught school from 1916 to 1931. Marshall was appointed an instructor in history at the University of New Mexico in 1930 and then became professor of history and chair of the social science department at Eastern New Mexico College, in Portales, New Mexico, in 1934–35. She then became an instructor in American history at Illinois State University in Normal, Illinois, where she remained until she retired in 1967 as a full professor. Marshall published Dorothea Dix: Forgotten Samaritan, a Book-of-the-Month Club alternate in 1937. Almost twenty years later Illinois State University Press published Grandest of Enterprises and then The Eleventh Decade in 1967. Five years later Marshall wrote Mary Adelaid Nutting: Pioneer in Modern Nursing with a U.S. Public Health Grant. In addition to her books, she contributed articles to the Journal of the Illinois Historical Society and the New Mexico Quarterly.

She died in August 1988.

References

1898 births
1988 deaths
University of Chicago alumni
Duke University alumni
20th-century American historians